George William Mote (1832–1909) was a British painter. Mote produced a series of landscape oil paintings. He started painting as the gardener/caregiver to Sir Thomas Phillips of Middle Hill. Many of Mote's paintings have been exhibited at Royal Academy and Suffolk Street Gallery of the Royal Society of British Artists.

References
E.Benezit, Dictionnairre des Peintres, Sculpteurs, Dessinateurs et Graveurs, Volume 9, Page 899
Christopher Wood, Dictionary of British Art - Volume IV, Victorian Painters, Page 367 (text), Page 331 (illustrations).

External links

1832 births
1909 deaths
19th-century British painters
British male painters
20th-century British painters
19th-century British male artists
20th-century British male artists